Sars-la-Bruyère Castle ( or Château-ferme de Sars-la-Bruyère, also known as Château-ferme de la Poterie) is a château-ferme, or fortified farmhouse, in Sars-la-Bruyère in the municipality of Frameries, province of Hainaut, Wallonia, Belgium.

The ruins of the 13th century donjon remain, but the greater part of the château was rebuilt in the 18th and 19th centuries.

See also
List of castles in Belgium

External links
 www.sars-la-bruyere-village.net

Castles in Belgium
Castles in Hainaut (province)